Susan Lynn Hurley (September 16, 1954 – August 16, 2007) was appointed professor in the department of Politics and International Studies at the University of Warwick in 1994, professor of philosophy at Bristol University from 2006 and the first woman fellow of All Souls College, Oxford. She wrote on practical philosophy as well as on philosophy of mind, bringing these disciplines closer together. Her work draws on sources from the social sciences as well as the neurosciences, and can be broadly characterised as both naturalistic and interdisciplinary.

Early life 
Hurley was born in New York City and brought up in Santa Barbara, California. Her mother, a first-generation Armenian immigrant, was a secretary, and her father was an aviation industry executive. After a philosophy degree at Princeton University (1976), she studied law at Harvard, resulting in a degree in 1988, and pursued graduate work in philosophy (a BPhil, 1979, and a doctorate, 1983) at Oxford, supervised primarily by John McDowell. She married the British neuroscientist, Professor Nick Rawlins, in 1986.

Philosophy of mind 
In Consciousness in Action, as well as in many of her articles, Hurley defends vehicle externalism, the view that mental processes do not necessarily have to be explained in terms of  internal processes. There is no good reason to assume, Hurley argues, that subpersonal processes on which the mind depends always need to respect the boney boundary of the skull. Hurley's externalism is connected to her critiques of what she has called 'the classical sandwich model of the mind'. Traditionally, philosophers and empirical scientists of the mind have regarded perception as input from world to mind, action as output from mind to world, and cognition as sandwiched between. According to Hurley there is no reason to suppose the mind is necessarily organised in this vertically modular way and, moreover, there is good reason to believe it is actually organised differently. An alternative would be a horizontally modular architecture, which is for example used in Rodney Brooks's robots. In one of her last texts, Hurley proposes a horizontally modular architecture that could enable social cognitive skills.

References

Bibliography

External links 
Hurley's website at the University of Bristol, which includes electronic versions of many of her papers. Access through the Wayback Machine Site.

20th-century British philosophers
21st-century British philosophers
Analytic philosophers
American people of Armenian descent
American expatriates in England
American emigrants to England
Fellows of All Souls College, Oxford
Philosophers of mind
1954 births
2007 deaths
British political philosophers
Educators from New York City
American women educators
People from Santa Barbara, California
Harvard Law School alumni
Princeton University alumni
20th-century American women
21st-century American women